Shari'ah or Islamic law is partially implemented in the legal system of the Philippines and is applicable only to Muslims. Shari'ah courts in the country are under the supervision of the Supreme Court of the Philippines.

Shari'ah courts in the Philippines has jurisdiction over the Muslim-majority Bangsamoro as well as other parts of Mindanao outside that autonomous region.

Background
The Shari'ah court system in the Philippines was a result of the Presidential Decree 1083 issued by then-President Ferdinand Marcos on February 7, 1977, which is also known as the Code of Muslim Personal Laws on the advice of the now-defunct Commission on National Integration.
Shari'ah courts are under the administrative supervision of the Supreme Court of the Philippines. Shari'ah in the country only deals with Muslim customary and personal laws and exclude criminal law.

Republic Act 6734, which was the Organic Law of the Autonomous Region in Muslim Mindanao recognized the two district courts under the now defunct autonomous region and also provided for the establishment of a Shari'ah Appellate Court, however such court was never established.

The Organic Law which served as the foundation of the Bangsamoro Autonomous Region in Muslim Mindanao provides for the formation of a Shari'ah High Court for the region.

Organization

Shari'ah District Courts
There are five Shari'ah District Courts in the Philippines, all of which has territorial jurisdiction over areas in Mindanao. The Shari'ah District Court is roughly equivalent to the Regional Trial Court in the regular and secular Philippine court system.

Shari'ah Circuit Courts
There are 51 circuit courts in Mindanao. Their scope is comparable to that of the regular court system's city and municipal courts.

Bangsamoro Shari'ah High Court
The Bangsamoro Organic Law, which became effective as of August 10, 2018, has provisions for the creation of a Shari'ah High Court for the Bangsamoro region. The high court will, if and when realized, have exclusive appellate jurisdiction over Shari'ah districts within the autonomous region.

Application

Personal status laws

Marriage
The Code of Muslim Personal Laws covers marriage done under Islamic rites. The same also recognizes divorce contrary to the Family Code of the Philippines which does not recognize divorce, baring most non-Muslim Filipinos from legally ending their marriage. Divorce between a non-Muslim and a Muslim is also recognized such as the divorce case of a Christian woman and a Muslim man who were married under Islamic rites which was upheld in 2016 by the Supreme Court.

Under the Muslim code a husband may seek for a "perpetual divorce" from his wife or invoke li'an to end his marriage if his spouse commits adultery. The wife may seek the termination of her marriage with her husband by invoking faskh if certain conditions are met including if her spouse commits "unusual cruelty", suffers from insanity or affliction of an incurable disease, or for six consecutive months neglects family support for six consecutive months. Talaq divorce may be invoked "may be effected by the husband in a single repudiation of his wife" after totally abstaining from sexual relations with his spouse.

Financial laws

Until 2019, there were no current framework legislation in effect that would allow the establishments of Islamic banks or banks compliant with Shari'ah. On August 22, 2019, Republic Act  11439 which is also known as "An Act Providing for the Regulation and Organization of Islamic Banks" was signed into law. Said legislation became effective on September 15, 2019 and introductory regulations for Islamic banks were released by the Bangko Sentral ng Pilipinas, the country's central bank on December 31, 2019.

Prior to 2019, the only Islamic bank which was allowed to operate is the Al-Amanah Islamic Bank which was founded in 1973. Legislation introduced in 2019 allowed foreign-based and domestic firms to establish full-fledged Islamic banks in the Philippines as well as the setting up of Islamic bank units or subsidiaries under secular banks.

Halal certification

Shari'ah legal practice
To become a lawyer under the Shari'ah court system of the Philippines, one must pass the Shari'ah Bar Exam which consists of the following subject matter: Code Muslim Personal Laws; Special Rules of Procedures; Jurisprudence (Fiqh), and the Muslim Law on Inheritance and Succession. A Shari'ah lawyer according to Bar Matter No. 681, a Supreme Court decision made en banc on August 5, 1993, is a "special member" of the Integrated Bar of the Philippines and not a fully pledged member. Members of the Shari'ah Bar are eligible to become circuit court judges but only those who are members of both the Shari'ah Bar and Regular Bar could be district court judges.

References

External links
 Institution Strengthening of the Shari'a Justice System (Phase 1), UNDP-funded report (June 2004)
 

Philippines
Islam in the Philippines
Law of the Philippines
Law about religion in the Philippines